The Jungle is the eighth novel of Clive Cussler's Oregon Files series. The hardcover edition was released March 8, 2011. Other editions were released on other dates.

Like the rest of the series, this book is about a series of exploits by the Corporation, headquartered in The Oregon, a ship that from the outside looks as if it is ready for the scrapyard. In reality this is a ruse, as the ship is as high tech as can be.

Plot
The Corporation is hired by a very wealthy man to find his adventurer daughter, who appears to have gotten into trouble in the jungles of Myanmar. 

What follows is an adventure that takes the Oregon crew to many locations around the world and at sea. The crew ends up being the only possible group that can prevent a super-villain from bringing the United States to its knees.

Reviews
As of 26 November 2018, Amazon.com gave 'The Jungle' an average rating of 4.3 out of five stars (based on 1,266 customer reviews), GoodReads.com an average of 4.12 of five stars (based on 8,762 ratings), and Barnes and Noble an average of 4.1 out of 5 stars (based on 466 reviewers).

Reception from professional reviewers was mixed.  Publishers Weekly said, "The frenetic action moves from Afghanistan to Singapore and to the Burmese jungle with lots of derring-do at sea before climaxing in a surprising locale in a fashion sure to delight series fans." David Connett, writing for The Express newspaper group, wrote, "Compared to genuinely innovative and exciting thrillers . . ., The Jungle looks like chaff." Jeff Ayers, writing with the Associated Press, wrote, "Instead of a complete novel, this feels like a rough draft rushed to meet a deadline."

References

2011 American novels
Novels by Clive Cussler
Novels by Jack Du Brul
The Oregon Files
G. P. Putnam's Sons books
Collaborative novels
Michael Joseph books